Marivate is a surname. Notable people with the surname include:

Charles Daniel Marivate (1924–2019), South African medical doctor, son of Daniel
Daniel Cornel Marivate (1897–1989), South African writer and composer